Chicken People is a 2016 documentary film about people who breed and raise chickens for exhibition. It is focused primarily on three subjects who compete in the Ohio National Poultry Show in Columbus, Ohio.

A number of reviewers compared it to the mockumentary Best in Show.

Synopsis
After an overview of people who have a passion for raising poultry, the film focuses on three main characters — Brian Caraker, a musical theater performer from Branson, Missouri; Brian Knox, an engineer of high performance race engines from New Hampshire; and Shari McCollough, a homemaker from Crawfordsville, Indiana.

Release

Critical response
Chicken People has received positive reviews from critics. Review aggregator Rotten Tomatoes gives the film an approval rating of 100% based on 20 reviews, with an average rating of 7.23/10. On Metacritic, the film has a score of 81 out of 100 based on 4 critics, indicating "universal acclaim".

Writing for The New York Times, Helen T. Verongos stated that "these chicken people, with deep connections to their birds, make for a fun and at times astonishing film." In a review for the Los Angeles Times, Katie Walsh wrote that "the film proves to be more than just a glimpse into a world that's easy to titter at. Haimes delves into the larger issues and psychological motivations that drive the kind of obsession that allows one to breed award-winning poultry." Joe Leydon, in a review for Variety, called it an "illuminating and amusingly entertaining look at the thriving subculture of competitive poultry breeders", and wrote that the film "generates a fair amount of suspense, [... but] it also abounds in moments of ineffably charming comic relief".

A review for The Village Voice criticized the filmmaker for not probing deep enough with some of the subjects and their "larger failure [...] in never finding much of a compelling reason for us to care about this subculture beyond surface geek-show intrigue."

References

External links
Chicken People at the distributor's website

Chicken People at the International Documentary Association

2016 films
2016 documentary films
American documentary films
Films set in Ohio
Films shot in Ohio
Documentary films about agriculture in the United States
Documentary films about competitions
Documentary films about Ohio
2010s English-language films
2010s American films